Revelation of the Last Hero is a 1992 Hong Kong wuxia romance television series produced by TVB and starring Aaron Kwok, Noel Leung, Ada Choi, Fennie Yuen, Frankie Lam and Bryan Leung. The theme song of the series, titled Breeze in the Frost (霧裡清風) by was sung by Kwok.

Synopsis

Cast
Aaron Kwok as Lok Fung (駱風)
Noel Leung as Yiu Chi-ping (姚子平)
Ada Choi as Ling Seung (凌湘)
Fennie Yuen as Hak-lin But-but (赫連勃勃)
Frankie Lam as Yiu Lik-hang (姚力行)
Bryan Leung as Hak-lin Mung-seun (赫連蒙遜)
Lau Kong as Sze-ma Chung-wang (司馬縱橫)
Mannor Chan as Ling Sin (凌仙)
Derek Kok as Sze-ma Yuk-man (司馬煜文)
Law Lok-lam as Hung Chun (洪震)
Wong Yat-fei as Chu Wong (朱皇)
Yu Ching-ching as Sing Pui-yu (盛佩如)
Andy Tai as Fong Ching (方靖)

See also
Aaron Kwok filmography

TVB dramas
1992 Hong Kong television series debuts
1992 Hong Kong television series endings
Hong Kong wuxia television series
Hong Kong action television series
Hong Kong romance television series
Martial arts television series
Serial drama television series
Costume drama television series
1990s Hong Kong television series
Cantonese-language television shows
1990s romance television series